Pushball is a game played by two sides on a field usually  long and  wide, with a ball  in diameter and  in weight. Occasionally, much heavier balls were used. The sides usually number eleven each, there being five forwards, two left-wings, two right-wings and two goal-keepers. The game lasts for two periods with an intermission. Pushing the ball under the bar counts 5 points; lifting or throwing it over the bar counts 8. A touchdown behind goal for safety counts 2 to the attacking side.

The game was invented by M. G. Crane of Newton, Massachusetts, in 1891, and was taken up at Harvard University the next year, but never attained any considerable vogue. Emory University students played pushball from 1923 to 1955 before the game was retired due to its increasingly rough nature.

In the United Kingdom the first regular game was played at The Crystal Palace in 1902 by teams of eight. The English rules are somewhat different from those obtaining in the United States. Pushball on horseback was introduced in 1902 at Durlands Riding Academy in New York, and has been played in England at the Military Tournament.

"Pushball on horseback" variations continued in Europe, and recently resurfaced as a growing equine activity in the United States, with variations including "horse soccer", "equine soccer", and "hoofball". The various games provide great fun for both horse and rider, while serving as a valuable training tool that can be enjoyed by one or more horsemanship team players. The most important safety factor (aside from basic horsemanship foundation and equine communication skills) requires that the ball be at least as tall as the mount's breastbone. Some play with a durable  cageball – a tough bladder caged inside a separate nylon cover, available from sporting goods suppliers.

A description of the rules can be found in the Spalding book Push Ball: History and Description of the Game, with the Official Playing Rules published in 1903 by Spalding's Athletic Library.

See also

 Bladderball

References

External links
 Pushball: A Strenuous New Game, C.H. Allison, National Magazine, October, 1905
 Push Ball Spalding's Athletic Library, 1903 at babel.hathitrust.org

Ball games
Articles containing video clips